The Stone Bridge (-Vojinovića most) is located in Vushtrri, Kosovo. It dates from the end of the 14th or early 15th century, and, according to popular legend, was built by the brothers Vojinović, mentioned in Serbian epic poetry as nephews of Tsar Dušan (King 1331 - 1346, tsar 1346 - 1355). It carried over the Sitnica river the trade route between Dubrovnik and Skopje and neighbouring parts of the Balkan Peninsula.

Despite the need, no conservation works were undertaken on the bridge, and in 1990 it was declared as a Monument of Culture of Exceptional Importance by the Republic of Serbia.

History 
The building of the bridge is traditionally attributed to the Vojinović brothers, to whom is also attributed the nearby Vučitrn Fortress, while its style places it at the end of the 14th or early 15th century. The Vojinovići existed as nobility in the first half of 14th century, and according to epic poetry were nephews of Emperor Dušan. However Vučitrn itself was outside their area of control, which was expanding to the nearby Zvečan, even at the time of their greatest power under the Vojislav Vojinović (around 1355 - 1363) and Nikola Altomanović (1366–1373). However, in Vučitrn in the early 15th century, the court of the house of Branković is mentioned, who were related to the Vojinović family: Ratoslava, the sister of Branko Mladenović (father of Vuk Branković) was married to Altoman Vojinović (father of Nikola Altomanović).

Architecture

The bridge carried the caravan route between Dubrovnik and Skopje across the river Sitnica. It is constructed of alternate red and grey trimmed stones. It is over 135 metres long with nine arches, and almost 5 metres wide. The arches are asymmetric, and most of them have a width of almost 13 metres. The course of the Sitnica changed over time: the bridge originally had 5 arches with sharp peaks, but 4 semicircular arches were subsequently added. The river continued to change its course over the centuries, and deposited sediment around the bridge, so that today the flowing river is no longer under it, and as a result of river sediment its total length has been reduced.

Notes

References

See also 

 Vushtrri
 Vushtrri Castle
 House of Vojinović
 Cultural heritage of Kosovo
 Monument of Culture of Exceptional Importance

Cultural Monuments of Exceptional Importance (Serbia)
Stone bridges in Kosovo
Vojinović noble family
Cultural heritage of Kosovo
Monuments and memorials in Kosovo
Architecture in Kosovo
Cultural heritage monuments in Vushtrri